is a Japanese male model.

Career
Daisuke Ueda was the first model in Asia to appear on the cover of Vogue Hommes Japan, photographed by Steven Klein with the artistic supervision of Nicola Formichetti. He has also been a spokesperson for the clothing company Gap and was in two campaigns for Dolce & Gabbana.

Agencies
Donna Inc - Tokyo
Female Models - Tokyo
New York Model Management
Nathalie Models - Paris
UNIQUE DENMARK - Copenhagen
D1 Model Management - London
Promad Model Agency - Hamburg
I LOVE Model Management - Milan
Jill Model Management - Antwerp
Sight Management - Barcelona

References

External links
 Site of Daisuke Ueda on Models.com

1987 births
Living people
Japanese male models